The 2016 Southend-on-Sea Borough Council election took place on 5 May 2016 to elect members of Southend-on-Sea Borough Council in England. This was on the same day as other local elections.

Result Summary

Prior to the election, three UKIP councillors left the UKIP group to sit as the Southend Independence Group. They are shown in the table as Independents.

Ward results

Belfairs

† percentage change is compared to the 2012 election

Blenheim Park

Chalkwell

Eastwood Park

Kursaal

Leigh

Milton

Prittlewell

Shoeburyness

† percentage change compared to 2012 election.

Southchurch

St. Laurence

St. Luke's

† percentage change compared to 2012 election

Thorpe

† percentage change compared to 2012 election

Victoria

West Leigh

West Shoebury

Westborough

References

2016 English local elections
2016
2010s in Essex